Steve Davis  (born 22 August 1957) is an English retired professional snooker player who is currently a commentator, musician, DJ, and author. He is best known for dominating professional snooker during the 1980s, when he reached eight World Snooker Championship finals in nine years, won six world titles, and held the world number one ranking for seven consecutive seasons. He was runner-up to Dennis Taylor in one of snooker's most famous matches, the 1985 World Championship final, whose dramatic black-ball conclusion attracted 18.5 million viewers, still the largest British television audience for any broadcast after midnight and any broadcast on BBC Two.

In addition to his six world titles, Davis won the UK Championship six times and the Masters three times for a total of 15 Triple Crown titles, placing him third on the all-time list behind Ronnie O'Sullivan (21) and Stephen Hendry (18). During the 1987–88 season, he became the first player to win all three Triple Crown events in a single season, a feat only two other players—Hendry and Mark Williams—have since emulated. His career total of 28 ranking titles places him fourth on the all-time list behind O'Sullivan (39), Hendry (36), and John Higgins (31). Davis was the first player to make an officially recognised maximum break in professional competition—at the 1982 Classic— and the first to earn £1 million in career prize money. Named the BBC's Sports Personality of the Year in 1988, he remains the only snooker player to win the award. He won his last major title at the 1997 Masters but competed at a high level into his 50s, making his last Crucible appearance in 2010 when he defeated the defending world champion John Higgins to become the oldest world quarter-finalist since 1983. He retired in April 2016 after 38 seasons on the professional tour, but remains active as a commentator and analyst for BBC's snooker coverage. As of 2022, he shares his record of 30 Crucible appearances with O'Sullivan.

Outside snooker, Davis competed in nine-ball pool tournaments, most notably representing Europe in the Mosconi Cup eleven consecutive times between 1994 and 2004. A keen chess and poker player, he served as president of the British Chess Federation between 1996 and 2001 and competed in televised poker tournaments. A fan of progressive rock, he has an ongoing career as a radio broadcaster, club DJ, and musician; with Kavus Torabi and Michael J. York, he co-founded the electronic music band the Utopia Strong. He has authored or co-authored books on snooker, chess, cooking, and music, as well as three autobiographies. In 2013, he featured as a contestant on I'm a Celebrity...Get Me Out of Here!. He was made an MBE in the 1988 Birthday Honours and an OBE in the 2000 New Year Honours.

Career

Early career (1970–1979)
Davis was born on 22 August 1957 in Plumstead, London, England. Davis's father Bill, a keen player, introduced him to snooker at the age of 12, and took him to play at his local working men's club. Bill gave Steve an instructional book: How I Play Snooker by Joe Davis. They studied the book, Davis later basing his technique on it during the 1970s. He began playing at the Lucania Snooker Club in Romford. The club manager brought his talent to the attention of Barry Hearn (chairman of the Lucania chain of snooker halls) when Davis was 18, and Hearn became his friend and manager. Paid £25 a match by Hearn, Davis toured the United Kingdom and participated in challenge matches against established professionals such as Ray Reardon, John Spencer and Alex Higgins. Around this time he was nicknamed "Nugget" because, according to Hearn, "you could put your case of money on him and you knew you were going to get paid."

Davis won the English Under-19 Billiards Championship in 1976. One of his last wins as a snooker amateur was against Tony Meo, another future professional, in the final of the 1978 Pontins Spring Open. He defended his title a year later, defeating future rival Jimmy White 7–4 in the final. Davis applied in 1978 to become a professional and was initially rejected, before being accepted with effect from 17 September 1978, becoming the youngest of the professional players.  He made his professional television debut on Pot Black, where he played against Fred Davis. He played in his first World Snooker Championship in 1979, having won two qualifying matches, but lost 11–13 to Dennis Taylor in the first round proper.

Early success (1980–1984)
At the 1980 World Snooker Championship he reached the quarter-finals, defeating Patsy Fagan and defending champion Terry Griffiths before losing to Alex Higgins 9–13. He won his first major title that year, the 1980 UK Championship, beating Griffiths 9–0 in the semi-finals and Higgins 16–6 in the final. After winning his first title, he won the Wilson's Classic in 1980, the Yamaha Organs and English Professional in 1981, and was the bookmakers' favourite to win the 1981 World Snooker Championship despite being seeded 13th. Davis reached the final by defeating White in the first round, Higgins in the second round, Griffiths in the quarter-finals and defending champion Cliff Thorburn in the semi-final. In the final, he won 18–12 against Doug Mountjoy to take his first world championship. Davis completed a 9–0 whitewash victory over Dennis Taylor in the International Open final and retained the UK Championship with a 16–3 win over Griffiths in the final, winning five events in 1981. In January 1982, Davis compiled the first televised maximum break at the Classic at Queen Elizabeth Hall in Oldham against John Spencer. As Lada were sponsoring the event, they offered Davis a car for completing the break. He reached the final, but lost 8–9 to Griffiths in the final. However, later that month Davis defeated Griffiths 9–5 in the Masters final, to win his first title.

His 18-month period of dominance ended at the 1982 World Snooker Championship, where he lost 1–10 to Tony Knowles in the first round. Despite this, he finished the season as the world number one for the first time. Davis lost to Griffiths in the quarter-finals  of the 1982 UK Championship later that year. After those two defeats, he won the World Doubles Championship with partner Tony Meo. Davis led 7–0 against Higgins in the 1983 UK Championship final, but lost on a  15–16. At the 1984 World Snooker Championship, he was the first player to retain his title at the Crucible Theatre – the event's venue since 1977 – by defeating Jimmy White 18–16 in the final, winning his second world championship. Davis also won the 1984 UK Championship, beating Higgins 16–8 in the final.

1985 World Snooker Championship

At the 1985 World Snooker Championship, Davis defeated Neal Foulds, David Taylor, Griffiths and Reardon en route to the championship final, where his opponent was Dennis Taylor. Davis won all of the frames in the first , and the first of the evening session, to lead 8–0 but Taylor recovered to trail 7–9. Taylor levelled the match for the first time to an 11–11; after Davis took the lead again, a second time from 12–15 to 15–15 and a third time from 15–17 to 17–17, forcing a deciding frame. With Davis leading 62–59 in the frame at that point, the player who potted the black ball would win the championship. After several failed attempts to pot it by either player, Taylor potted the ball to win the title. The final was watched by 18.5 million viewers, setting records for BBC Two and for a post-midnight audience on British television. The final, later called the "black ball final", was voted the ninth-greatest sporting moment of all time in a 2002 Channel 4 poll; Davis's disbelief and Taylor's triumphant, pointing finger have been replayed many times on television.

Later World Snooker Championship victories (1985–1989)
Davis and Taylor met again in the final of the 1985 Grand Prix, but this time Davis won in a deciding frame. At 10 hours 21 minutes, it was the longest one-day final in snooker history. Davis trailed Willie Thorne 8–13 in the 1985 UK Championship final. Davis also won the 1986 British Open, with a 12–7 win over Thorne. At the 1986 World Championship, Davis defeated White 13–5 in the quarter-finals and Thorburn 16–12 in the semi-finals. His opponent in the final was Joe Johnson, who started the tournament as an outsider to win, with odds of 150–1. Davis lost the match, 12–18. At the end of 1986, he beat Foulds 16–7 to retain the 1986 UK Championship.

Davis began 1987 by winning the Classic 13–12 against defending champion Jimmy White. At the 1987 World Snooker Championship, he defeated Griffiths 13–5 in the quarter-final and White 16–11 in the semi-final. Meeting Johnson again in the final, he established a 14–10 lead after three sessions. Johnson reduced Davis's lead to 14–13, but Davis took four of the next five frames to win the match 18–14 and regain the title, his fourth world championship. In December he retained his UK title with a 16–14 win against White in the final. Davis retained the Classic in 1988 before claiming his second Masters title: in the final he completed a 9–0 whitewash of Mike Hallett, the only such result in the event's history. He also won the World Cup with England and secured his fourth Irish Masters title. In that year's World Championship Davis defeated Hallett 13–1, Tony Drago 13–4 and Thorburn 16–8 en route to the final, where he met Griffiths. Davis established a 5–2 lead after the first session, but Griffiths levelled at 8–8 after the second. On the second day of the match, Davis took ten out of thirteen frames to win his fifth world title 18–11.

He won the first ranking event of the 1988–89 snooker season, a 12–6 victory over White in the International Open. During the same match, Davis became the first player to make three consecutive century breaks in a major tournament. In October, he won the Grand Prix final 10–6 against Alex Higgins and held the World, UK, Masters, Grand Prix, Classic and Irish Masters titles simultaneously. His four-year unbeaten run in the UK Championship ended in December with a 3–9 semi-final loss to Hendry. Davis did not win another major title until the 1989 World Championship, where he beat Hendry 16–9 in the semi-finals before the most decisive victory in a world final of the modern era: an 18–3 win against John Parrott, for his sixth world championship. He retained the Grand Prix in October, beating Dean Reynolds 10–0 in the final – the first whitewash in a ranking-event final. By the end of the 1980s, Davis was snooker's first millionaire.

Last ranking event win (1990–1995)
Davis began the 1990s by winning the Irish Masters for the fifth time, defeating Taylor 9–4.
Davis was denied an eighth consecutive appearance in the 1990 World Snooker Championship final by Jimmy White, who won their semi-final 16–14. He was succeeded as world number one by new world champion Stephen Hendry, at the end of the 1989–90 snooker season, Davis having held the spot for seven consecutive seasons. The following season, Davis reached the final of the UK Championship again and played Hendry, losing on a deciding frame 15–16. Davis won the Irish Masters again, defeating Parrott 9–5 in the final. At the world championship, Davis reached the semi-final but lost to Parrott 16–10.

Davis won the Classic defeating Hendry 9–8, and then won the Asian Open beating Alan McManus 9–3. He did not win a match at the 1992 World Snooker Championship, however, as he was beaten 4–10 by Peter Ebdon, the first time he had lost in the opening round in nine years. He won the European Open in 1993 where he completed a 10–4 victory against Hendry in the final. Davis won a seventh Irish Masters event in 1993, where he defeated McManus 9–4. At the 1993 World Snooker Championship, Davis defeated Ebdon, who had defeated him the year previously 10–3, but lost again to McManus in the second round 13–11. Davis won his eighth (and final) Irish Masters event in 1994 with a deciding frame win over McManus. Davis progressed past the second round for the first time in three years at the 1994 World Snooker Championship, defeating Dene O'Kane, Steve James and Wattana but was defeated by Hendry 9–16 in the semi-final. Over the next two seasons, Davis won consecutive Welsh Open titles. At the 1994 event, he completed three consecutive whitewash 5–0 victories, and won the final 9–6 over McManus. The following season at the 1995 event, he defeated John Higgins 9–3 in the final. This victory was his last ranking title of his career.

Masters champion for the last time (1996–2000)
In 1996, Davis reached the quarter-finals of both the Masters and world championship, losing to McManus and Ebdon, respectively. The following year, at the 1997 Masters, Davis reached the final, defeating McManus, Ebdon and Doherty. Trailing O'Sullivan 4–8 in the final, Davis won six frames in a row, securing a 10–8 victory. The win was Davis's last fully professional title of his career, his third Masters title. At the world championship later that year, Davis defeated David McLellan in the opening round, before losing to Doherty 3–13. He also reached the second round in the 1998 event, where he defeated Simon Bedford, but lost to Williams 6–13.

For the 1998–99 season Davis's best result was reaching the quarter-finals at the 1998 UK Championship, the first time he had progressed past the third round in five years, but lost to Paul Hunter. He also reached the same stage at the 1999 Welsh Open, but lost to Williams. However, at the 1999 World Snooker Championship, he was unable to win a match, losing in the first round on a deciding frame to Joe Perry. He did reach the quarter-finals of the 1999 British Open in 1999–2000, but only won one match at the 2000 World Snooker Championship, defeating Graeme Dott, but losing to Higgins 11–13. After this loss, Davis fell out of the top 16 in the world rankings for the 2000–01 season for the first time since 1980 and would not play in the Masters for the first time since he first qualified.

Fall out of the top 16 (2000–2005)
Davis's best result during the season was a quarter-final appearance at the 2001 Irish Masters losing to O'Sullivan. Davis failed to qualify for the 2001 World Snooker Championship, losing 6–10 to Andy Hicks in the last qualifying round. This was the first time Davis would be absent from the event since his debut in 1979.  After the loss, he contemplated retirement, but said that it would be the "easy thing to do". Since he still enjoyed the challenge of professional play he continued into the 2001–02 snooker season and reached the semi-finals of the 2002 LG Cup and the quarter-finals of the 2003 Irish Masters the following season. However, Davis was unable to qualify for the 2002 World Snooker Championship, losing 8–10 to Robin Hull in the final round of qualification.

Despite this, his previous results were enough to regain his place in the top 16 for the 2003–2004 season, starting ranked 11th in the world. Despite not progressing past the third round in any other events, Davis reached the final at the 2004 Welsh Open. This was nine years after he last won a ranking event at the 1995 Welsh Open. He defeated Mark King, Higgins, Milkins and Marko Fu and met O'Sullivan in the final. In the best of 17 frames match, he led 8–5, but lost 8–9. He reached the quarter-finals of the 2005 World Snooker Championship, losing to eventual winner Shaun Murphy.

Later career (2005–2010)

Davis reached his 100th major career final at the 2005 UK Championship in York, his first appearance in the event's final since 1990. He beat defending champion Stephen Maguire and Hendry before he lost 6–10 to Ding Junhui in the final. Davis brushed off suggestions of retirement before the World Championships, and reached the second round where he lost to Murphy. His performances during the 2006–07 season, including reaching the 2006 UK Championship quarter-finals and the Welsh Open semi-finals, ensured that Davis was still a top-16 player at the age of 50. Although Davis dropped out of the top sixteen a year later, he reached successive quarter-finals at the Shanghai Masters and Grand Prix in 2008. At the 2009 World Snooker Championship, Davis lost 2–10 to Neil Robertson in the first round. At the 2009 UK Championship, he defeated Michael Judge 9–7 to set up a first-round match against Hendry which he lost 6–9.

He qualified for the 2010 World Snooker Championship, his 30th time at the event, by defeating Adrian Gunnell 10–4. In the first round, Davis beat Mark King 10–9, and at 52, he was the oldest player to win a match at the Crucible since Eddie Charlton defeated Cliff Thorburn in 1989. In the second round, against defending champion John Higgins, Davis won 13–11, a win commentator Clive Everton called "the greatest upset in the 33 years the Crucible has been hosting the championship." This made him the oldest world quarter-finalist since Charlton in 1983. In the quarter-final match against Australian Neil Robertson, Davis lost 5–13. Despite having his best run at the World Championship for five years and reaching the quarter-finals for only the second time since 1994, this was his last appearance at the Crucible; he failed to qualify for the tournament again before his retirement. O'Sullivan equalled Davis's record of 30 Crucible appearances in 2022.

Davis participated in the Players Tour Championship in 2010; his best result was at the Paul Hunter Classic, where he reached the quarter-finals before losing 1–4 to Shaun Murphy. He finished 67th on the Order of Merit. He reached the final of the 2010 World Seniors Championship, losing 1–4 to Jimmy White. He narrowly reached the last qualifying round of the 2011 World Snooker Championship by defeating Jack Lisowski 10–9 before losing 2–10 to Stephen Lee.

Retirement (2010–2016)

Davis began the 2011–12 season ranked world number 44, his lowest rank since turning professional. Davis reached the final of the 2011 World Seniors Championship before losing 1–2 to Darren Morgan. He participated in the 2011–12 Players Tour Championship; his best result was in the Warsaw Classic, where he reached the semi-finals before losing 3–4 to Ricky Walden, finishing at number 26 on the Order of Merit. He qualified for the 2011 UK Championship by defeating Ian McCulloch and Andrew Higginson, but lost 1–6 in the first round to O'Sullivan. He reached the last 16 of the Welsh Open before losing 0–4 to Murphy. Davis did not qualify for the World Snooker Championship 7–10 to Ben Woollaston.

He qualified for the 2012 Shanghai Masters, before losing 4–5 to Ricky Walden. He qualified for the final stages of the 2012 UK Championship, before losing 2–6 to Carter. He again participated in the Players Tour Championship; his best results were in the Kay Suzanne Memorial Trophy and the Scottish Open, where he reached the last 16 before losing 3–4 to John Higgins and 1–4 to Ding Junhui. He placed 52nd on the tour's Order of Merit. He finished the season in the qualifying stage of the World Championship, losing 7–10 to Maflin. He won his first World Seniors Championship in 2013 by defeating Nigel Bond, 2–1. After being beaten by Craig Steadman 8–10 in the second round of the 2014 World Snooker Championship qualification, Davis finished the season outside the top 64 on the money list and dropped off the main professional tour after 36 years.

Davis received an invitational tour card for tournaments in the 2014–15 season. He played in the 2014 Champion of Champions event after qualifying with the 2013 World Seniors Championship, losing 1–4 to Mark Selby in the group semi-final. Davis entered the 2016 World Snooker Championship qualifiers, and lost to Fergal O'Brien in his final professional match. During a live 17 April 2016 BBC broadcast, he announced his retirement from professional snooker, citing the recent death of his father as the main reason. Davis entered the Crucible Theatre holding the World Championship trophy, and received a standing ovation from the audience. During his career he won over £5.5 million in prize money. As of 2021, he continues to play exhibitions, and is a pundit and commentator for the BBC's snooker coverage of Triple Crown events.

Other sports

From 1994 to 2007, Davis regularly participated in professional nine-ball pool events; he was instrumental in creating the Mosconi Cup, an annual nine-ball pool tournament contested between teams representing Europe and the United States. He represented Europe in the tournament eleven times, and was a member of the victorious 1995 and 2002 teams; his victory against the US's Earl Strickland clinched the 2002 competition for Europe. In 2001, Davis reached the final of his first pool event at the World Pool League before losing 9–5 to Efren Reyes. Sky Sports commentator Sid Waddell gave him the nickname "Romford Slim", calling him Britain's answer to American pool player Rudolf "Minnesota Fats" Wanderone. Davis dislikes blackball pool as played on English-style tables in British pubs and clubs, considering it a "Mickey Mouse game" when played with a smaller cue ball than the other balls, although he is happy with the game when played with uniform balls.

He reached the last 16 of the 2003 WPA World Nine-ball Championship in Cardiff, Wales, where he faced three-time champion Strickland. The match was notable for the behaviour of its players. Strickland accused members of the crowd of bias towards Davis; when warned by referee Michaela Tabb, he told her to "shut up". He complained after Davis took a second toilet break (when only allocated one), and Davis later admitted that the second break was gamesmanship against his opponent. Strickland won the match, and proceeded to the semi-finals.

Davis has become a proficient poker player, with successful appearances at televised tournaments; they included an appearance at the final table of the 2003 Poker Million with Jimmy White, who eventually won. He finished 579th at event 41 of the 2006 World Series of Poker, winning $20,617. At event 54 of the 2008 World Series of Poker, Davis finished 389th and won $28,950.  He finished 131st, winning $5,491, at event 56 of the 2010 World Series of Poker. At event 22 of the 2011 Grand Poker Series, Davis finished eighth and won $2,049.

A keen chess player, he served as president of the British Chess Federation from 1996 until 2001. Davis co-authored Steve Davis Plays Chess, a 1995 book.

In other media
Davis has become known for his coolness and conduct in high-pressure situations. His initial lack of emotional expression and monotonous interview style earned him a reputation as boring, and the satirical television series Spitting Image nicknamed him "Interesting". Davis has since played on this image, and says it helped him gain public acceptance. He co-authored How to Be Really Interesting with Geoff Atkinson, a 1988 book on whose cover he wears boxing regalia and holds a cue.

Davis has worked with a series of video games. He appeared in a spoof online promotion for the Nintendo DS game World Snooker Championship: Season 2007–08, parodying a Nicole Kidman Brain Training advertisement, and worked with the World Snooker Championship franchise and Virtual Snooker. He also gave his name to two video games, Steve Davis Snooker in 1984 and Steve Davis World Snooker in 1989. In 2010, Davis played himself on The Increasingly Poor Decisions of Todd Margaret; other television appearances include the Christmas 1981 episode of The Morecambe & Wise Show.

Davis has published a number of other books. Five relate to snooker: Successful Snooker (1982), Frame and Fortune (1982), Steve Davis: Snooker Champion (1983), Matchroom Snooker (1988) and The Official Matchroom 1990 Snooker Special. He co-authored two chess books in 1995 with David Norwood: Steve Davis Plays Chess and Grandmaster Meets Chess Amateur. Davis wrote three 1994 cookbooks: Simply Fix – the Steve Davis Interesting Cookbook No 1 – Interesting Things to Do With Meat, Simply Fix – The Steve Davis Interesting Cookbook No 2 – Interesting Things to Make with Poultry, and Simply Fix – the Steve Davis Interesting Cookbook No 3 – Interesting Things to Make Using Vegetables. His third autobiography, Interesting, was published in 2015. Davis also co-produced a music book with Kavus Torabi titled Medical Grade Music in 2021.

He participated in the thirteenth series of I'm a Celebrity...Get Me Out of Here! in 2013, finishing in eighth place. The Rack Pack, a 2016 BBC television film about professional snooker during the 1970s and 1980s focusing on Davis's rivalry with Alex Higgins, featured Will Merrick as Davis.

Music

When in the sixth form at school, Davis began listening to progressive rock and was introduced to the Canterbury scene, which immediately fascinated him. Interviewed in 2020, Davis said, "I loved what bands like Soft Machine and Henry Cow were doing – it was challenging and very complex." Regarding Robert Wyatt, he said, "...one album in my collection that I would strong urge everyone to get is Rock Bottom. It's the type of album that you have to hear when you're smashed out of your face. It is just an incredible record. Davis is a fan of French progressive rock band Magma, and produced a London concert so he could see them, which directly caused their re-formation. He has a record collection with around 2,000 albums.

Davis joined Brentwood community radio station Phoenix FM in 1996, broadcasting a variety of soul and rock shows during the next ten years online and on FM under a Restricted Service Licence. When the station went full-time on FM in March 2007, he hosted The Interesting Alternative Show. As a result of his broadcasts, Davis was a guest presenter on BBC Radio 6 Music in 2011. He branched out into club work in 2015, and has regular slots at London bars and nightclubs. Davis performed with Kavus Torabi at the 2016 Glastonbury Festival; their collaboration led to the formation of the Utopia Strong, an electronic music band whose debut album was released on 13 September 2019.

He joined Chas & Dave and several other snooker stars (as the Matchroom Mob) on "Snooker Loopy", a 1986 novelty record which was a Top 10 hit in the UK Singles Chart. A year later they released "Romford Rap", a follow-up single which reached number 91 on the UK charts.

In September 2021 Davis appeared in a music video for a track titled "Lily" from the upcoming Richard Dawson and Circle collaborative album.

Legacy
Davis won a record 84 professional titles and was the runner-up in 38 events, with 28 of these as ranking event victories. His modern-era record of six world titles has been broken by both Stephen Hendry and Ronnie O'Sullivan, and his six UK Championship titles has been bettered only by O'Sullivan. Davis compiled 355 competitive centuries during his career. He was coached by Frank Callan for much of his career, who also represented Hendry in the 1990s. In 2011, Davis was inducted into World Snooker's new Hall of Fame with seven other former world champions. In the book Masters of the Baize, a detailed comparison and ranking of snooker professionals, Luke Williams and Paul Gadsby rated Davis as the third-greatest snooker player of all time (behind Joe Davis and Hendry).

Davis was one of the first professional players to play in China, touring through the 1980s. This, along with highly lucrative off-table endorsements, both set up by Hearn, allowed him to become the United Kingdom's highest paid sportsperson in the later half of the 1980s. During the 2010 world championship, to mark the anniversary of the 1985 world championship final, Davis appeared with Taylor before the beginning of the first semi-final to stage a humorous re-enactment of their historic final frame; Taylor entered the arena wearing a pair of comically oversized glasses, and Davis arrived sporting a red wig.

Personal life and honours 
In 1988, Davis became the only snooker player named as the BBC Sports Personality of the Year, and was made an MBE. He was made an OBE in 2000, and has been honorary president of the Snooker Writers' Association. Although he was on the board of Leyton Orient F.C., he has been a Charlton Athletic F.C. fan most of his life. He divorced his first wife Judith in 2005 after 15 years of marriage. They had two sons: Greg (born in 1991) and Jack (born in 1993). In 2012, Greg Davis entered the Q-School with the aim of winning a place on the professional snooker tour.

Performance and rankings timeline

Career finals

Ranking finals: 41 (28 titles)

Non-ranking finals: 81 (56 titles)

Team finals: 12 (10 titles)

Pro-am finals: 4 (4 titles)

Pool tournament wins
• Mosconi Cup (1995, 2002)

See also

Notes

References

Further reading

External links 

 
 
The Interesting Alternative Show on Phoenix FM

1957 births
People from Plumstead
Living people
Snooker players from London
Masters (snooker) champions
Trick shot artists
English players of English billiards
English pool players
English sports broadcasters
English radio DJs
DJs from London
English male writers
BBC Sports Personality of the Year winners
Officers of the Order of the British Empire
Snooker writers and broadcasters
World number one snooker players
Poker players from London
English writers
BBC sports presenters and reporters
Articles containing video clips
People from Romford
UK champions (snooker)
Sportspeople from Essex
People from Brentwood, Essex
Winners of the professional snooker world championship
I'm a Celebrity...Get Me Out of Here! (British TV series) participants